Eosphaeria is a genus of fungi within the Lasiosphaeriaceae family. This is a monotypic genus, containing the single species Eosphaeria uliginosa.

References

External links
Eosphaeria at Index Fungorum

Lasiosphaeriaceae
Monotypic Sordariomycetes genera
Taxa named by Franz Xaver Rudolf von Höhnel